Taruo Lake or Taruocuo, also known as Taro Tso is a lake in Zhongba County in the Shigatse Prefecture of the Tibet Autonomous Region of China. It is located about 70 kilometres west of Coqên Town.  It is 38.1 km long and 17.2 km wide and has an area of 486.6 square km.

References

Shigatse
Lakes of Tibet